Kappu Bilupu is a 1969 Indian Kannada language film directed by Puttanna Kanagal. Based on a novel of the same name by Aryamba Pattabhi, this movie revolves around the contrasting behaviors of an identical, yet distinct pair of twins. The film starred Kalpana in dual roles. Puttanna himself remade the movie in Tamil as Irulum Oliyum and in Telugu as Iddaru Ammayilu.

Puttanna used the movie as a medium for speaking to the youth of the ideals he derived from Vivekananda. The settings are simple and mostly rural. The story is about how domestic peace was better than a glamorously consumptive lifestyle. The juxtaposition of the two sisters played by Kalpana in a black and white background was a clever trick. H R Shastry and Balakrishna play dignified elders who in many ways are sympathetic but helpless. There were a couple of simple but moving melodies.

CAST
Kalpana (double role)

Rajesh

R.N Sudarshan

Balakrishna

Story
A Cinderella-inspired story. A commentary on the ultimate triumph of good character over situational advantages. Kalpana as Vatsala is a poor and docile girl ill-treated by her stepmother. Her second character Chandra is rich, arrogant and bold.

Soundtrack
R. Rathna composed the music for the soundtrack.

Remakes
The film was remade in 1971 by Puttanna in two languages - in Tamil as Irulum Oliyum and in Telugu as Iddaru Ammayilu.

References

External links

1960s Kannada-language films
Films based on Indian novels
Films directed by Puttanna Kanagal
Kannada films remade in other languages